The Kingston Town Stakes is an Australian Turf Club Group 3 Thoroughbred horse race at set weights and penalties for horses aged three years old and older, over a distance of 2000 metres. It is held annually at Randwick Racecourse, Sydney, Australia in September. Total prizemoney for the race is A$200,000.

History
The race is named in honour of the champion Kingston Town, who also won this race as the STC Cup twice.

Name
 1948–1983 - STC Cup
 1984 onwards - Kingston Town Stakes

Grade
 1946–1978 - Principal Race
 1979–1989 - Group 2
 1990 onwards - Group 3

Distance
 1948–1971 -  miles (~2400 metres)
 1972–1990 - 2400 metres
 1991 - 1900 metres
 1992 - onwards 2000 metres

Venue
 1991 - Race held at Canterbury Park

Winners

 2022 - Alegron
 2021 - She's Ideel
 2020 - Taikomochi
 2019 - Finche
 2018 - Avilius
 2017 - Libran
 2016 - McCreery
 2015 - Silverball
 2014 - He's Your Man
 2013 - Prince Cheri
 2012 - Stout Hearted
 2011 - Lamasery
 2010 - Herculian Prince
 2009 - Ready To Lift
 2008 - Hurrah
 2007 - †race not held
 2006 - Mr Martini
 2005 - Stormhill
 2004 - Just Polite
 2003 - Ariante
 2002 - Dress Circle
 2001 - Swiss Echo
 2000 - Dashing Scene
 1999 - Vita Man
 1998 - Greenmailer
 1997 - Classy Fella
 1996 - Yobro
 1995 - Balmeressa
 1994 - Century Reign
 1993 - Never Say
 1992 - Regal Sea
 1991 - Lord Revenir
 1990 - Brixton Town
 1989 - Copatonic
 1988 - Kruthoffer
 1987 - Easy Life
 1986 - Wineglass
 1985 - Pekamagess
 1984 - Our Compromise
 1983 - Tulsa Knight
 1982 - Lordship
 1981 - Kingston Town
 1980 - Kingston Town
 1979 - French Command
 1978 - Lavache
 1977 - Saramore
 1976 - Gold And Black
 1975 - Nourishing
 1974 - History
 1973 - Analie
 1972 - With A Will
 1971 - Tails
 1970 - Regal Jane
 1969 - Tails
 1968 - Pirate Bird
 1967 - El Gordo
 1966 - Clovelly
 1965 - Amusement Park
 1964 - Piper's Son
 1963 - Alpensea
 1962 - River Seine
 1961 - Sharply
 1960 - Valerius
 1959 - Valerius
 1958 - Monte Carlo
 1957 - Aqua Boy
 1956 - Advocate
 1955 - Sobriquet
 1954 - Sir Pilot
 1953 - Alinga
 1952 - Aristocrat
 1951 - Yeoval
 1950 - Carapooe
 1949 - Foxzami
 1948 - Columnist

† Not held because of outbreak of equine influenza

See also
 List of Australian Group races
 Group races

External links 
 Kingston Town Stakes (ATC)

References

Horse races in Australia